Solanum fortunense is a species of plant in the family Solanaceae. It is found in Costa Rica and Panama.

References

fortunense
Vulnerable plants
Taxonomy articles created by Polbot